Housing Affairs Letter is a news service (or newsletter) produced in Silver Spring, MD by CD Publications that covers the public, private and subsidized housing industries. It is one of the oldest continuing publications of its kind.

History
Housing Affairs Letter was the first newsletter produced by CD Publications upon its founding in 1961. It began publication four years before the creation of the U.S. Department of Housing and Urban Development, and a significant percentage of its coverage since then has focused on HUD.

Over the years, HAL articles have been reprinted, referenced, quoted or mentioned in numerous periodicals and journals, including The Washington Post, the National Review, The Journal of Housing, and the Journal of Urban Law.

HAL has been mentioned in or used as a reference for many books, including:
Problems in Political Economy: An Urban Perspective 
Where to Find Business Information: A Worldwide Guide for Everyone who Needs the Answers to Business Questions 
Leading Issues in Black Political Economy 
A Right to Housing: Foundation for a New Social Agenda 
The Encyclopedia of Housing 
The Review of Black Political Economy 
Housing Urban America 
Housing: Federal Policies and Programs 
Journalism That Matters: How Business-to-Business Editors Change the Industries They Cover 
A Different Vision 
HUD Scandals: Howling Headlines and Silent Fiascoes 

Additionally, HAL has appeared in Congressional reports, in documents of city planning and development committees, and in multiple publications of such housing organizations as the Fannie Mae Foundation. In 2007, HAL appeared as "suggested additional reading" on Dr. Sammis B. White's syllabus for a class entitled "Housing Markets and Public Policy." It was mentioned alongside such respected national publications as Fortune, Forbes and the Wall Street Journal.

Current Coverage
HAL reports on the full housing industry, with emphases on HUD, Fannie Mae, Federal Reserve Board activities, Congressional legislation and Fair Housing.

Expansion
In 2007, HAL was changed to a web-based format and, along with CD Publications' other housing news services, was moved onto the web portal HousingandDevelopment.com.

See also
CD Housing Register
Community Development Digest
Landlord Law & Multi-housing Report

References

External links
 CD Publications Home
 HousingandDevelopment.com

Magazines established in 1961
Newsletters
Magazines published in Maryland
Online magazines published in the United States